William Boggs Whitt was an American businessman and politician. 

He was the former mayor of Ashland, Kentucky, who had also been a state senator. In 1895, Whitt organized a grocery store with Charles Kitchen in Ashland, calling it Kitchen, Whitt & Co. Three years later it was incorporated with a capital of $100,000.

According to the Mount Sterling Advocate, "the people of Beckham County are especially indebted to Senator W. B. Whitt, through whose untiring energy and wise management, the formation of the county was secured".

Whitt committed suicide on December 19, 1926, shooting himself through the heart.

Notes and references

Mayors of Ashland, Kentucky
Kentucky state senators
1867 births
1926 deaths
People from Carter County, Kentucky
Mayors of places in Kentucky
Suicides by firearm in Kentucky